Sister Jeanne-d'Arc Bouchard  (born 1929 in Sainte-Hedwidge) is a Québécoise nun and nurse.

Biography
In 1945, at the age of sixteen, Jeanne-d'Arc Bouchard joined the Augustinian congregation of the Mercy of Jesus of Roberval, Quebec. In 1953 she graduated as a nurse and worked with alcoholics and drug addicts. In the 1960s Bouchard initiated the first public program that supported the families of her patients. Until 1989, she was in charge of the Rehabilitation Unit at Hôtel-Dieu de Roberval.

Sister Bouchard was a pioneer in the rehabilitation of alcohol and drug addicts in Canada. In 1992 she was the first recipient of the award of excellence from the Quebec Association of Addiction Practitioners (AITQ); the award now bears her name. In 2000 
Quebec Premier Lucien Bouchard presented her with the Chevalier badge of the National Order of Quebec.
In 2008 Bouchard was made a Member of the Order of Canada.

A bronze bust of Bouchard by Jérémie Giles was erected in Roberval near the sculpture of Christ the King on the Rue Brassard.

References

1929 births
Living people
French Quebecers
Members of the Order of Canada
Canadian nurses
Canadian women nurses
Knights of the National Order of Quebec
21st-century Canadian nuns
People from Roberval, Quebec
20th-century Canadian nuns